Fashion is known to be a form of expression throughout many cultures, just like the Mexican American culture. Over the decades Mexican American women's fashion evolved to celebrate beauty and fashion standards of the day. However, such evolution wasn't often well seen by society, instead it was often deemed non-normative and un-American. This style evolution started in the 1940s when the Pachuca culture came to be, and later evolved into the Chicanas in the 70s and the Cholas in the 90s.

Pachucas - 40s 
Pachucas were second generation Mexican Americans, characterized for their Zoot suits and how they used fashion in order to express their sexuality, individuality, class and race. The efforts these women made to claim public space through their characteristic style was not well seen in society at the time, especially due to the repercussions WWII had on society. Prior and during the WWII era, Mexican American women had excluded from cultural categories such as “American,” “lady,” and “patriot” despite their attempts to belong to such categories, the Pachuca style was another attempt to fit into society, but in their own way, they took conventional clothing styles and added their own touch. Their style consisted of zoot suits, which consisted of an oversized coat with shoulder pads, and an option between oversized pants or fitted skirts; as for their makeup and hair, it consisted of the heavy use of mascara and lipstick, they also liked wearing high pompadour and flowers on their hair. During this time, it was expected for everyone to present a united front as the country was faced with the crisis brought upon by WWII. Pachucas were considered individualistic figures based their use of fashion; their extravagant outfits caused them to stand out and call attention to themselves and show that they too had class and that they were also able to afford expensive clothing as were the zoot suits. Unfortunately for the Pachucas, Zoot suits did not have the response they were expecting, society was quick to deem zoot suits as non-normative and a wrongful way of gender expression; Zoot suits were considered to be masculine clothing and went against the feminine ideals of the time, which is why Pachucas were often considered queer or homosexual.

Chicanas - 70s 
Chicanas arose around the time of the Civil rights movement and the Women's rights movement. Their Style was still strongly influenced by the American movie industry, during this time Mexican American women began to further break off of their conservative clothing style that was a part of their cultural norm, they started wearing jeans and rather tight clothing. This period of time was of great significance for Mexican American women because they started to speak up and express their opinions and desires, they started demanding their rights as a part of the American society. During this time Mexican American women were part of multiple protests and organizations such as the Brown Berets, the Chicano movement and Chicana feminism.

Cholas - 90s 
The Chola style was a combination of styles and it was heavily influenced by the hip-hop culture, the Pachuca style and the gang culture. Cholas were characterized by their oversized clothing and flannel shirts as well as by the use of dark lip liners, dramatic eyeliner and thin eyebrows, and to top it off, an excessive use of hair spray. Overall, cholas had a tough girl look that resulted from all the hardships they had to face as minority group. Through their style they inspired fear, but their style was more than that, the chola style gave them a sense of belonging within their cultural environment which was heavily influenced by gang activity. In one of the interviews conducted by M.G. Harris, one of the interviewees answered, “If you live where I live, you want to be a gang member”. In order to become part of the gang, women had to adopt the manners and style of the other gang members.

References 

Mexican-American culture